Strood Rural District was a rural district in the county of Kent, England.

It was subject to boundary reforms in 1934 and 1935.

It consisted of the following civil parishes:

Allhallows (1935–1974; gained from Hoo Rural District)
Chalk (1894–1935; abolished and transferred to the Municipal Borough of Gravesend)
Cliffe
Cobham
Cooling (1935–1974; gained from Hoo Rural District)
Cuxton
Denton (1894–1935; abolished and transferred to the Municipal Borough of Gravesend)
Frindsbury Extra (part transferred to the City of Rochester in 1934)
Halling
Higham
High Halstow (1935–1974; gained from Hoo Rural District)
Hoo St Werburgh (1935–1974; gained from Hoo Rural District)
Ifield (1894–1935; abolished and split between Cobham and the Municipal Borough of Gravesend)
Isle of Grain (1935–1974; gained from Hoo Rural District)
Luddesdown
Meopham
Nurstead
Shorne
St Mary Hoo (1935–1974; gained from Hoo Rural District)
Stoke (1935–1974; gained from Hoo Rural District)
Strood Extra (1894–1934; abolished and split between Cuxton and the City of Rochester)

On 1 April 1974 the district was abolished and split between the new districts of Medway and Gravesham.

References

 

Districts of England created by the Local Government Act 1894
Districts of England abolished by the Local Government Act 1972
History of Kent
Politics of Medway
Local government in Kent
Rural districts of England